Timothy Ian Atherton (born 7 November 1989) is an Australian professional baseball player for the Brisbane Bandits of the Australian Baseball League.

Career
Atherton has played four seasons with the Canberra Cavalry, one season for the Sydney Blue Sox and the two most recent seasons with the Brisbane Bandits.

He was a part of the Bandits 2017-18 and 2018-19 championships, becoming the first player to be named twice ABLCS MVP.

International career
He was a member of the Australia national baseball team in the Australia Series, Australian Challenge, 2016 Haarlem Baseball Week, 2017 World Baseball Classic, 2018 exhibition series against Japan, and 2019 WBSC Premier12.

References

External links

Tim Atherton stats ABL.com

1989 births
Living people
Australian expatriate baseball players in the United States
Baseball pitchers
Beloit Snappers players
Brisbane Bandits players
Canberra Cavalry players
Cedar Rapids Kernels players
Elizabethton Twins players
Gulf Coast Twins players
Midland RockHounds players
People from New South Wales
Sacramento River Cats players
Stockton Ports players
Sydney Blue Sox players
2017 World Baseball Classic players
2019 WBSC Premier12 players
2023 World Baseball Classic players